Frank Simoes (1937–2002) was an Indian writer and pioneering advertising executive, the first Indian to set up his own advertising agency, born in Mumbai.

He initially worked for advertising agency Ogilvy & Mather before setting up his own company; his campaigns included work for Only Vimal, Raymonds, Taj Hotels, Liberty Shirts, and BOAC.

He quit advertising while still successful in the 1970s, (Frank Simoe's only closed shop post 1985. I know as I was working there till April 1985. - Noel Keymer).sold his firm, and moved to Goa to become a writer.

He began his career as a writer with The Times of India. After his initial foray into writing, he began to have his articles published fairly regularly.

Malavika Sanghvi wrote in her column in The Times:

References

1937 births
2002 deaths
Journalists from Goa
Indian advertising people
Indian Roman Catholics
The Times of India journalists
Writers from Mumbai
20th-century Indian journalists